Sagalassa nephelospila is a moth in the family Brachodidae. It was described by Edward Meyrick in 1912. It is found in Venezuela and Guyana.

References

Brachodidae
Moths described in 1912